Hajatan (also Romanized as Ḩājatān; also known as Ḩājat) is a village in Qaedrahmat Rural District, Zagheh District, Khorramabad County, Lorestan Province, Iran. At the 2006 census, its population was 156, in 31 families.

References 

Towns and villages in Khorramabad County